Aerokurier is a monthly magazine founded in 1957 covering international civil aviation published in the German language by Motor Presse Stuttgart, a large European publisher of special interest magazines. The magazine concentrates on the following subjects:
    General aviation
    Business aviation
    Air sports
    Gliding
    Ultralight aviation
    Flight training
    Developments in aviation technology
    Airports
    Political topics concerning aviation

Aerokurier is the principal sponsor of the Online Contest (OLC), a worldwide decentralized soaring competition for glider, hang glider, and paraglider pilots.

References

External links
 Official site

1957 establishments in West Germany
Aviation magazines published in Germany
German-language magazines
Magazines established in 1957
Magazines published in Stuttgart
Monthly magazines published in Germany
Transport magazines published in Germany